Buduburam FC is a football club based in Buduburam, Gomoa East District, Ghana. It competed in the Ghana Division Two until the 2009–10 season.

History

Created  in 2001 by Liberian expatriate footballers in Ghana who wanted  to have a club for local and foreign footballers. It is seen as one of the preeminent football clubs in the Gomoa East District.

Club Officials
Coach George Pele Quansah- Senior Coach

Assist. Coach- Coach Kwodjoe

Team President: Matthew Gaye (Boye or FA Boss)

Team Manager: Wellington Sokan

Team Doctor/ Medic: Miss Evelyn

Team Adviser 1: Mr. Namayan Kollie

Team Adviser 2: Mr. Willie D. Anderson Jr.

Team Captain: Abdul K. Kamara (George Weah)

Team Assist. Captain: Baccus Barh

Team Computer Engineer/ P.R.O: Daniel Kobe Ricks (Kobe Don Dee)

Source:

Players
As of 5 April 2017

Former players
  Archie Harvey (Harnosands FF)
  Hassan Kanneh (Harnosands FF)
  Christian Essel (Zaytuna F.C.)
  Amos Marah (unattached)
  Ben Teekloh (retired)
  Francis Doe (Selangor FA)
  Aloysius Pennie (retired) Michael T. Jurry (retired)

References

2001 establishments in Ghana
Football clubs in Ghana
Association football clubs established in 2001
Central Region (Ghana)